OSIRIA station is a railway station of the Donghae Line in Gijang-eup, Gijang County, Busan, South Korea.

Station layout

Gijang County
Korail stations
Railway stations in Busan